Maria Mintscheva (sometimes listed as Mariya Mincheva), born 7 February 1952) is a Bulgarian sprint canoer who competed in the late 1970s and early 1980s. She won two medals in the K-4 500 m event at the ICF Canoe Sprint World Championships with a gold in 1977 and a silver in 1978.

Mintscheva also competed in two Summer Olympics, earning her best finish of seventh in the K-2 500 m event at Montreal in 1976.

References

1952 births
Bulgarian female canoeists
Canoeists at the 1976 Summer Olympics
Canoeists at the 1980 Summer Olympics
Living people
Olympic canoeists of Bulgaria
ICF Canoe Sprint World Championships medalists in kayak